The 64th Annual Tony Awards took place on Sunday, June 13, 2010, held again at Radio City Music Hall in New York City. The host was Sean Hayes.  These awards recognize Broadway productions during the 2009–2010 season.  The cut off-date for Tony eligibility was April 29, 2010, and the nominations were announced on May 4.

The play Red won 6 awards, including Best Play, the most of the night.  The musical Memphis won four awards, including Best Musical. Fences won three awards, including Best Revival of a Play.  La Cage aux Folles also won three awards, including Best Revival of a Musical.

The CBS television network broadcast the event, which was also simulcast live to the Clear Channel Spectacolor HD Screen in Times Square as well as on the official Tony Awards website. The director of the telecast, Glenn Weiss, won the Directors Guild of America award for Outstanding Directorial Achievement in Musical Variety.

Among the highlights was presenter Kristin Chenoweth and Hayes poking fun at a recent Newsweek article questioning the openly gay Hayes' believability at playing heterosexual by passionately kissing.

Awards ceremony

Presenters
Presenters included:

Paula Abdul
Billie Joe Armstrong
Antonio Banderas
Justin Bartha
Laura Benanti
Cate Blanchett
Patrick Breen
Laura Bell Bundy
Michael Cerveris
Kristin Chenoweth
Barbara Cook
Michael Douglas
Kelsey Grammer†
Rosemary Harris†
Patrick Heusinger
Katie Holmes
Brian d'Arcy James
Scarlett Johansson†
Nathan Lane
Angela Lansbury†
Anthony LaPaglia
Laura Linney†
Lucy Liu
Jan Maxwell†
Idina Menzel
Lea Michele
Alfred Molina†
Helen Mirren
Matthew Morrison
Chris Noth
Bebe Neuwirth
Bernadette Peters
David Hyde Pierce‡
Daniel Radcliffe
Eddie Redmayne†
Mark Sanchez
Tony Shalhoub
Liev Schreiber†
Jada Pinkett Smith
Will Smith
Stanley Tucci
Denzel Washington†
Raquel Welch

† = 2010 nominee‡ = 2010 Isabelle Stevenson Award winner

Performances
The show opened with a medley from most of the musicals that opened during the season, and included, as described by The New York Times, punk music, Frank Sinatra songs, Afrobeat rhythms, and early rock ’n’ roll.

There were performances by the casts of the musicals nominated for both Best Musical and Revival: American Idiot, Fela!, Memphis, Million Dollar Quartet, La Cage aux Folles, A Little Night Music, Everyday Rapture and Ragtime. Other performers were Lea Michele, who sang "Don't Rain On My Parade" and Matthew Morrison, who sang "All I Need Is the Girl", and punk rock band Green Day who performed "Know Your Enemy/Holiday". The casts of Come Fly Away and Promises, Promises were included in a presentation of choreography. Additionally, the nominees for Best Play and Best Play Revival were presented by the performers from their respective plays.

Creative Arts Tony Awards
Some of the Tony Awards, dubbed "The Creative Arts Tony Awards" were awarded prior to the CBS telecast. The presentation was shown on a live webcast. Hosts for this portion of the ceremony were Karen Olivo and Gregory Jbara.  Awards presented at this special ceremony included Best Book of a Musical, Best Original Score, Best Orchestrations, Special Tony Awards and the eight design prizes.

Ineligibility rulings
The Tony Administration Committee decided on April 30, 2010 that the scores of American Idiot and Fela! were ineligible for Tony Award nominations because fewer than 50% of their scores were written for the stage productions.

On May 14, 2010, the Tony Award committee announced a disqualification of a nomination in the "Best Costume Design in a Musical" category for Ragtime, stating that "...Santo Loquasto's designs for the revival of Ragtime are predominantly those from the original 1998 production, and therefore do not meet the Tony rule which states, work that 'substantially duplicate(s)' work from a prior production is ineligible."

Competitive awards
Source: Tony Awards

Winners are listed first and highlighted in boldface.

{| class=wikitable width="95%"
|-
! style="background:#C0C0C0;" ! width="50%" | Best Play
! style="background:#C0C0C0;" ! width="50%" | Best Musical
|-
| valign="top" |
 Red – John Logan
 In the Next Room (or The Vibrator Play) – Sarah Ruhl
 Next Fall – Geoffrey Nauffts
 Time Stands Still – Donald Margulies
| valign="top" |
 Memphis American Idiot Fela! Million Dollar Quartet|-
! style="background:#C0C0C0;" ! style="width="50%" | Best Revival of a Play
! style="background:#C0C0C0;" ! style="width="50%" | Best Revival of a Musical
|-
| valign="top" |
 Fences Lend Me a Tenor The Royal Family A View from the Bridge| valign="top" |
 La Cage aux Folles Finian's Rainbow A Little Night Music Ragtime|-
! style="background:#C0C0C0;" ! style="width="50%" | Best Performance by a Leading Actor in a Play
! style="background:#C0C0C0;" ! style="width="50%" | Best Performance by a Leading Actress in a Play
|-
| valign="top" |
 Denzel Washington – Fences as Troy Maxson
 Jude Law – Hamlet as Hamlet
 Alfred Molina – Red as Mark Rothko
 Liev Schreiber – A View from the Bridge as Eddie Carbone
 Christopher Walken – A Behanding in Spokane as Carmichael
| valign="top" |
 Viola Davis – Fences as Rose Maxson
 Valerie Harper – Looped as Tallulah Bankhead
 Linda Lavin – Collected Stories as Ruth Steiner
 Laura Linney – Time Stands Still as Sarah Goodwin
 Jan Maxwell – The Royal Family as Julie Cavendish
|-
! style="background:#C0C0C0;" ! style="width="50%" | Best Performance by a Leading Actor in a Musical
! style="background:#C0C0C0;" ! style="width="50%" | Best Performance by a Leading Actress in a Musical
|-
| valign="top" |
 Douglas Hodge – La Cage aux Folles as Albin
 Kelsey Grammer – La Cage aux Folles as Georges
 Sean Hayes – Promises, Promises as Chuck Baxter
 Chad Kimball – Memphis as Huey Calhoun
 Sahr Ngaujah – Fela! as Fela Kuti
| valign="top" |
 Catherine Zeta-Jones – A Little Night Music as Desiree Armfeldt
 Kate Baldwin – Finian's Rainbow as Sharon McLonergan
 Montego Glover – Memphis as Felicia Farrell
 Christiane Noll – Ragtime as Mother
 Sherie Rene Scott – Everyday Rapture as Herself
|-
! style="background:#C0C0C0;" ! style="width="50%" | Best Performance by a Featured Actor in a Play
! style="background:#C0C0C0;" ! style="width="50%" | Best Performance by a Featured Actress in a Play
|-
| valign="top" |
 Eddie Redmayne – Red as Ken
 David Alan Grier – Race as Henry Brown
 Stephen McKinley Henderson – Fences as Jim Bono
 Jon Michael Hill – Superior Donuts as Franco
 Stephen Kunken – ENRON as Andy Fastow
| valign="top" |
 Scarlett Johansson – A View from the Bridge as Catherine
 Maria Dizzia – In the Next Room (or The Vibrator Play) as Mrs. Daldry
 Rosemary Harris – The Royal Family as Fanny Cavendish
 Jessica Hecht – A View from the Bridge as Beatrice
 Jan Maxwell – Lend Me a Tenor as Maria
|-
! style="background:#C0C0C0;" ! style="width="50%" | Best Performance by a Featured Actor in a Musical
! style="background:#C0C0C0;" ! style="width="50%" | Best Performance by a Featured Actress in a Musical
|-
| valign="top" |
 Levi Kreis – Million Dollar Quartet as Jerry Lee Lewis
 Kevin Chamberlin – The Addams Family as Uncle Fester
 Robin de Jesús – La Cage aux Folles as Jacob
 Christopher Fitzgerald – Finian's Rainbow as Og
 Bobby Steggert – Ragtime as Younger Brother
| valign="top" |
 Katie Finneran – Promises, Promises as Marge MacDougall
 Barbara Cook – Sondheim on Sondheim as Various Characters
 Angela Lansbury – A Little Night Music as Madame Armfeldt
 Karine Plantadit – Come Fly Away as Kate
 Lillias White – Fela! as Funmilayo Kuti
|-
! style="background:#C0C0C0;" ! style="width="50%" | Best Direction of a Play
! style="background:#C0C0C0;" ! style="width="50%" | Best Direction of a Musical
|-
| valign="top" |
 Michael Grandage – Red
 Sheryl Kaller – Next Fall Kenny Leon – Fences Gregory Mosher – A View from the Bridge| valign="top" |
 Terry Johnson – La Cage aux Folles
 Christopher Ashley – Memphis Marcia Milgrom Dodge – Ragtime Bill T. Jones – Fela!|-
! style="background:#C0C0C0;" ! style="width="50%" | Best Book of a Musical
! style="background:#C0C0C0;" ! style="width="50%" | Best Original Score (Music and/or Lyrics) Written for the Theatre
|-
| valign="top" |
 Joe DiPietro – Memphis
 Dick Scanlan and Sherie Rene Scott – Everyday Rapture Jim Lewis and Bill T. Jones – Fela! Colin Escott and Floyd Mutrux – Million Dollar Quartet| valign="top" |
 Memphis – David Bryan (music and lyrics) and Joe DiPietro (lyrics) The Addams Family – Andrew Lippa (music and lyrics)
 Enron – Adam Cork (music) and Lucy Prebble (lyrics)
 Fences – Branford Marsalis (music) 
|-
! style="background:#C0C0C0;" ! style="width="50%" | Best Choreography
! style="background:#C0C0C0;" ! style="width="50%" | Best Orchestrations
|-
| valign="top" |
 Bill T. Jones – Fela! Rob Ashford – Promises, Promises Lynne Page – La Cage aux Folles Twyla Tharp – Come Fly Away| valign="top" |
 Daryl Waters and David Bryan – Memphis
 Jason Carr – La Cage aux Folles Aaron Johnson – Fela! Jonathan Tunick – Promises, Promises|-
! style="background:#C0C0C0;" ! style="width="50%" | Best Scenic Design of a Play
! style="background:#C0C0C0;" ! style="width="50%" | Best Scenic Design of a Musical
|-
| valign="top" |
 Christopher Oram – Red
 John Lee Beatty – The Royal Family Alexander Dodge – Present Laughter Santo Loquasto – Fences| valign="top" |
 Christine Jones – American Idiot
 Marina Draghici – Fela! Derek McLane – Ragtime Tim Shortall – La Cage aux Folles|-
! style="background:#C0C0C0;" ! style="width="50%" | Best Costume Design of a Play
! style="background:#C0C0C0;" ! style="width="50%" | Best Costume Design of a Musical
|-
| valign="top" |
 Catherine Zuber – The Royal Family
 Martin Pakledinaz – Lend Me a Tenor Constanza Romero – Fences David Zinn – In the Next Room (or The Vibrator Play)| valign="top" |
 Marina Draghici – Fela!
 Paul Tazewell – Memphis Matthew Wright – La Cage aux Folles|-
! style="background:#C0C0C0;" ! style="width="50%" | Best Lighting Design of a Play
! style="background:#C0C0C0;" ! style="width="50%" | Best Lighting Design of a Musical
|-
| valign="top" |
 Neil Austin – Red
 Neil Austin – Hamlet Mark Henderson – Enron Brian MacDevitt – Fences| valign="top" |
 Kevin Adams – American Idiot
 Donald Holder – Ragtime Nick Richings – La Cage aux Folles Robert Wierzel – Fela!|-
! style="background:#C0C0C0;" ! style="width="50%" | Best Sound Design of a Play
! style="background:#C0C0C0;" ! style="width="50%" | Best Sound Design of a Musical
|-
| valign="top" |
 Adam Cork – Red
 Acme Sound Partners – Fences Adam Cork – Enron Scott Lehrer – A View from the Bridge| valign="top" |
 Robert Kaplowitz – Fela!
 Jonathan Deans – La Cage aux Folles Dan Moses Schreier and Gareth Owen – A Little Night Music Dan Moses Schreier – Sondheim on Sondheim|}

In Memoriam

Shirley Rich
David Powers
Douglas Watt
Shelly Gross
Lynn Redgrave
Corin Redgrave
Budd Schulberg
Quentin Easter
Rue McClanahan
Max Eisen
Larry Gelbart
Dixie Carter
George N. Martin
Conard Fowkes
Michael Frazier
Torrie Zito
Joseph Wiseman
Michael Kuchwara
Doris Eaton
Morton Gottlieb
Donal Donnelly
John Kenley
Zakes Mokae
June Havoc
Everett King
Ron Konecky
Gene Barry
Pierre Cossette
M. Edgar Rosenblum
Claude Purdy
Lena Horne

Non-competitive awards
Most of the non-competitive awards were announced on April 21, 2010. They are:

Lifetime Achievement in the Theatre to Sir Alan Ayckbourn and Marian Seldes.
Isabelle Stevenson Award to David Hyde Pierce. Pierce is receiving the Isabelle Stevenson Award "for his work in the fight against Alzheimer's disease."
Tony Honors for Excellence in Theatre to:
The Alliance of Resident Theatres New York.
B.H. Barry, who "pioneered the teaching of stage combat as part of the curriculum in US Drama Programs at the University and Graduate level."
Tom Viola, executive director of Broadway Cares/Equity Fights AIDS (BC/EFA).
The Midtown North and South New York City Police Precincts.
The Regional Theatre Tony Award to The Eugene O'Neill Theater Center, Waterford, Connecticut.

Summary of awards
The musical Fela! and the revival of La Cage aux Folles, each received eleven nominations, the most of any production, with each winning three awards. The musical Memphis won four awards, including Best Musical. The revival of Fences earned ten nominations, the most nominations ever received by a play revival, and won three awards.  The new play Red received seven nominations and won six awards, the most of any play or musical this season.

Film actors won an unusual number of awards this season, with Denzel Washington, Scarlett Johansson, Viola Davis, Eddie Redmayne and Catherine Zeta-Jones among the winners.  So many film actors appeared on Broadway last year that theatre actor Hunter Foster created a Facebook page called "Give the Tonys Back to Broadway".  The New York Times critic Charles Isherwood wrote, "I share to a certain extent Mr. Foster’s dismay at this year’s star-glutted Tony awards. ... It’s possible that if the Tony administrators had not kicked the journalists out of the voting pool, there might have been a few more worthy winners."  Isherwood called the proliferation of Hollywood stars on Broadway "ominous", claiming that projects from last season featuring film actors such as Jude Law's Hamlet and A Steady Rain monopolized the box office, causing "superior" plays to fail.  On the other hand, Isherwood felt, it is possible that "welcoming [film] stars on Broadway – the talented ones, anyway – [could help] New York theater to reassert its importance to the culture, and maybe even to tilt the balance of the entertainment business at least a little back toward the East Coast".

Multiple nominations and awards

These productions had multiple nominations:11 nominations: Fela! & La Cage aux Folles10 nominations: Fences & Memphis7 nominations: Red  6 nominations: Ragtime & A View from the Bridge 5 nominations: The Royal Family 4 nominations: Enron, A Little Night Music & Promises, Promises    3 nominations: American Idiot, Finian's Rainbow, In the Next Room (or The Vibrator Play), Lend Me a Tenor & Million Dollar Quartet 2 nominations: The Addams Family, Come Fly Away, Everyday Rapture, Hamlet, Next Fall, Sondheim on Sondheim & Time Stands StillThe following productions received multiple awards.6 wins: Red4 wins: Memphis 3 wins: Fela!, Fences & La Cage aux Folles 2 wins: American Idiot''

See also
 Drama Desk Awards
 2010 Laurence Olivier Awards – equivalent awards for West End theatre productions
 Obie Award
 New York Drama Critics' Circle
 Theatre World Award
 Lucille Lortel Awards

References

External links
Tony Awards official site

Tony
Tony Awards ceremonies
2010 awards in the United States
2010 in New York City
2010s in Manhattan
Television shows directed by Glenn Weiss